Tifa or Tiffa may refer to:

Mladen Vojičić Tifa, Bosnian singer, lead vocalist of Bijelo Dugme from 1984 to 1986
 Tifa Lockhart, character from Final Fantasy VII
 Trade and Investment Framework Agreement
 Tiffa Adill, a character in After War Gundam X
 Tiffania Westwood, a character in The Familiar of Zero light novel and anime series
 Tifa, the name of a number of places in Jaraguá do Sul, Brazil
 Tifa (drum), a traditional musical instrument in Indonesia and Papua New Guinea
 Trucks Involved in Fatal Accidents, see Work-related road safety in the United States

See also
 List of Wikipedia articles beginning with "Tifa"
 Tiffany (given name)
 Tyfa, a type of foundry in former Czechoslovakia
 Typha, genus of cattail plants
 Tipha (disambiguation)
 Teefa in Trouble, film